Marlon Klein  (born 13 December 1957 in Herford, Germany) is a musician and producer in the World Music and Fusion genres. He is a co-founder of the German group Dissidenten.

Career
Klein's musical career started with studies of classical percussion at the Hochschule für Musik Detmold. In the late 1970s he was one of the founders of the Real Ax Band, part of the  independent music distributorship Schneeball. Real Ax Band's song "Samba Mortale" became a success in Europe and in Brazilian clubs.

In 1982 Klein co-founded Dissidenten with Uve Müllrich and Friedo Josch Klein. Together with the American Saxplayer Charlie Mariano and the South Indian Karnataka College of Percussion they gained worldwide attention. Following this project Klein and Dissidenten focussed on North Africa, working in collaboration with Moroccan musician Lem Chaheb. This project produced the album Sahara Elektrik with the song "Fata Morgana"..

Klein has collaborated as producer and musician for Pili Pili, Angelique Kidjo, Gary Wright, Sven Väth, Yello, Manickam Yogeswaran and Charlie Mariano.

At present Klein is working with Spain's Tomas San Miguel and his group Txalaparta, performing with the Australian-Finnish singer songwriter Esther Bertram as the Bertram-Klein Duo, with Manickam Yogeswaran and guitar player Jens Fischer in the Euro-Indian trio Peace4Paradise. Together with Dissidenten, Klein is producing the new album, The Tangier Sessions, with the  participation of Morocco's musical group Jil Jilala.

At present Marlon Klein is living in Ibiza and Berlin.

Main groups and projects

Real Ax Band
Dissidenten
Karnataka College of Percussion
Lem Chaheb
Jil Jilala
Charlie Mariano
Jasper van 't Hof
Pili Pili
Gary Wright
Phikelela Sakhula Zulu Choir
Stephan Eicher
Manfred Schoof
Dieter Meier
Yello
Sven Väth
Oliver Lieb
Tomas San Miguel
Txalaparta
Manickam Yogeswaran
Esther Bertram
Peace4Paradise
Angelique Kidjo

Producer for Sire, Wea, Teldec, Metronome, Virgin, Jaro, Narada, Exil, and Nuevos Medios.

Discography

2018 Real Ax Band - Just Vibrations - Live At The Quartier Latin Berlin / Germany
drums, percussion, composer, producer

2008 Dissidenten - The Tangier Sessions /  Morocco-Germany-Spain
drums, percussion, keyboards, composer, producer

2007 Esther Bertram -  Alchemy Of The Heart / Australia - Germany - UK
drums, percussion, composer, producer

2007 Spooky Tooth -  Nomad Poets / Germany - US - UK
Live Recording

2006 Beat'n Blow  - The Sound Of Blasmusik / Berlin - Germany
percussion, producer

2006 Vange Milliet -  Tudo Em Mim Anda a Mil / Brazil
drums, percussion, producer

2005 Hotlips - Never Never Land / Europe
drums, percussion, composer, producer

2005 Tomas San Miguel - Dan Txa / Spain
drums, percussion, producer

2004 Manickam Yogeswaran - Peace for Paradise / Worldwide
drums, perc, keyboards, composer, producer

2004 Rosanna & Zelia - ÁGUAS-IGUAIS  / Germany - Brasil
percussion

2004 Pili Pili - Post Scriptum / Europe
drums, percussion, keyboards, composer, producer

2003 Esther Bertram - Urban Angel / Australia - Germany - UK
percussion, composer, producer

2002 Dissidenten - A New Worldbeat Odyssey / Worldwide
drums, percussion, keyboards, composer, producer

2001 Dissidenten - 2001: A Worldbeat Odyssey / Worldwide
drums, percussion, keyboards, composer, producer

2000 Arabian Nights - Mil e Uma Noites Som Livre / Brasil
musician, producer

2000 The Real Happy Singers - Walk Softly Like A Cat / South Africa
producer

2000 Daniel Balavoine and Stefan Eicher - Hommage / France
drums, programming

1999 Pili Pili -  Love Letter featuring the Phikelela Sakhula Zulu Choir / Worldwide
drums, percussion, keyboards, composer, producer

1999 Gary Wright - Human Love / US
drums, percussion, keyboards, composer, producer

1998 Dissidenten - Live in Europe featuring Charlie Mariano / Worldwide
drums, percussion, keyboards, composer, producer

1998 Tomas San Miguel y Txalaparta - Ten  / Spain
drums, percussion, keyboards, composer, producer

1997 Dissidenten - Instinctive Traveler featuring Bajka / Worldwide
drums, percussion, keyboards, composer, producer

1996 Thomas Kessler -  On Earth / Germany
drums, percussion, composer

1996 Manickam Yogeswaran - Tamil Classics  / India.
producer

1996 Dissidenten Mixed Up Jungle with Sven Väth, Apacho, Rhythm Ace / Worldwide
drums, percussion, keyboards, composer, producer

1995 Pili Pili - Dance Jazz Live 1995 / Germany, Europe
drums, percussion

1995 Dr.Raghavendra & KCP - 'Shiva Ganga/ US, India
producer

1994 Pili Pili Boogaloo featuring Angelique Kidjo / Benin – Netherlands
drums, producer

1994 Gary Wright with George Harrison - First Sign of Life / US
drums, percussion, keyboards, composer, producer

1993 Raphael - The Calling / US / Maui / Spain
drums, percussion, keyboards, composer, producer

1992 Dissidenten -  The Jungle Book / Germany / India
drums, percussion, keyboards, composer, producer

1990 Wild Orchid -  Soundtrack WEA
drums, percussion, keyboards, composer, producer

1989 Dissidenten - Out of This World Spain / Morocco-Spain
drums, percussion, keyboards, composer, producer

1988 Dissidenten - Live In New York / US
drums, percussion, keyboards, composer, producer

1987 Pili Pili - Be In Two Minds featuring Angelique Kidjo / Netherlands / France / Spain
drums, percussion, keyboards, composer, producer

1986 Dissidenten Life At The Pyramids / France / Spain / Morocco
drums, percussion, keyboards, composer, producer

1986 Pili Pili Jacko-Jacko, featuring Angelique Kidjo / Netherlands / Nigeria / Benin
drums, percussion, keyboards, composer

1985 Dissidenten - Arab Shadows / Morocco - Spain
drums, percussion, keyboards, composer, producer

1984 Pilot Pirx and Dieter Meier (Yellow) - Bungalow, Bungalow - Exzess Im Bungalow / Germany
drums, percussion, keyboards, composer, producer

1984 Flucht nach Vorne - O Cubano / Germany
percussion, producer

1983 Dissidenten - Sahara Elektrik / Morocco - Germany
drums, percussion, keyboards, composer, producer

1983 Dissidenten - Germanistan Tour  / Europe / India
1982 1. Futurologischer Congress Wer Spricht? / Germany
drums, percussion, keyboards, composer, producer and founder

1982 Dissidenten Germanistan / Germany / India
drums, percussion, keyboards, composer, producer and founder

1978 Missus Beastly and the Real Ax Band at the Umsonst & Draussen Festival / Germany
drums, percussion, keyboards, composer

1976 ( rereleased 2000) Real Ax Band - Move Your Ass In Time'' / UK - Germany - Ghana
drums, percussion, keyboards, composer, producer

External links
Marlon Klein Homepage
Dissidenten Homepage

1957 births
Living people
German male musicians
People from Herford
Hochschule für Musik Detmold alumni